"Somewhere Down the Crazy River" is a 1987 song by Robbie Robertson, initially released on Robertson's debut solo album Robbie Robertson, with Sam Llanas on backing vocals.

Background
When one of the producers, Daniel Lanois, was asked about the inspiration for "Somewhere Down the Crazy River", he said that the song was "kind of like a guy with a deep voice telling you about steaming nights in Arkansas". He went on to say that Robertson was describing his experiences of hanging out in his old neighbourhood of Arkansas with Levon Helm (fellow The Band member) during hot nights in which they were "fishing with dynamite" and had asked a local for directions to "somewhere down the crazy river".

In terms of composition, the song features a "sweet and wonderful" chord sequence on the Suzuki Omnichord, which had been introduced to Lanois by Brian Eno. As Robertson developed the chord sequence, Lanois surreptitiously recorded him and superimposed his storytelling on top.

Cash Box called it a "masterful cut" that "generates a powerful vision of steamy life in a more primitive phase, on a river from soul of Louisiana, or the Nile, or the mortal soul" and is "done with spoken word and a chant-like vocal and poetic lyrics that speak with a novelist's tongue and the heart of Huckleberry."

Music video
Martin Scorsese directed a music video for the song, his second after directing the Michael Jackson Video for Bad featuring Maria McKee and Sam Llanas (credited as Sammy BoDean). Steve Spears of Tampa Bay Times notes in his review for it that "things get pretty steamy near the end of the video for Robertson and McKee as the two seem to take method acting seriously".

Reception
The song was subject to mixed reviews by critics. Steve Spears of Tampa Bay Times called the song "sexy", whereas Mark Deming of AllMusic wrote that Robertson was "exploring the same iconography of the Band's best work, but without the same grace or subtle wit".

Chart performance
It reached No. 15 on the UK Singles Chart, No. 24 on Billboard Mainstream Rock Tracks and won Robertson and Daniel Lanois the Canadian Producer of the Year Award for 1989. In Robertson's home country Canada, it debuted at No. 95 on the week ending 2 April 1988 and then peaked at No. 91 for two weeks until the week ending 16 April 1988.

Weekly charts

Year-end charts

Personnel
Robbie Robertson – vocals, backing vocals, spoken words, guitar, keyboards
Manu Katché – drums
Bill Dillon – guitars
Tony Levin – bass

Additional personnel
Sammy BoDean – backing vocal

Use in media
The song also appeared in the 1988 compilation album The Hits Album 9.

References

1989 singles
Robbie Robertson songs
Songs written by Robbie Robertson
1987 songs
Geffen Records singles
Song recordings produced by Daniel Lanois
Music videos directed by Martin Scorsese
Song recordings produced by Robbie Robertson